Toshkent is a station of the Tashkent Metro on Oʻzbekiston Line. The station was opened on 8 December 1984 as the eastern terminus of the inaugural section of the line, between Alisher Navoiy and Toshkent. On 6 November 1987 the line was extended to Chkalov. It serves Tashkent's main-line railway station. Column-type station with two underground vestibules. Located beneath the forecourt. Decoration of the walls and ceiling like the head of the column and made in the traditional national spirit, in the stair descents on a platform made of the image, dedicated to the 2200th anniversary of Tashkent and on "Tashkent - a city of peace and friendship," here emblem of the city. When finishing the station it is widely used in marble, granite, ceramics, metal, glass and other materials.

References

Tashkent Metro stations
Railway stations opened in 1984
1984 establishments in Uzbekistan